Puerta Real ("Royal Gate" in English) is an historic area in the city centre of Granada, Spain that includes Recogidas St, Reyes Católicos St and Carrera de la Virgen.

History
It was named after the visit of king Felipe IV on 8 April 1624. According to documents, he visited during a storm through the gate of El Rastro or of La Paja in the Muslim defensive wall, which was known as Bib-al-Rambla. It became the central square of  Granadine social life in the 16th century. In 1515 it was decorated with the Catholic Monarchs' coat of arms. In 1610 the new national symbols commemorating the reconquest of Spain from Muslim rule were added.

Puerta Real has suffered many changes during its life. Until the 19th century Darro River ran through it, but it was enclosed for reasons of hygiene. Until then Granadine social life had centred round Elvira Street and Nueva Square, but Puerta Real then became more popular. Several commercial establishments were set up in Puerta Real, including the no longer existing Casino.

Areas inside Puerta Real
Another important place was the Swiss Café, located next to Mesones Street, also built in the late 19th century.

Another area inside Puerta Real is Genil Avenue, so named because it was built over Genil River. At the end of this street, we can find the place where Genil River and Darro River meet. Along this avenue, it is placed Nuestra Señora de las Angustias Church, the virgin of Granada.

Buildings and structures in Granada